The Album of the Year is a compilation album presented by American hip hop record label Suave House Records. It was released on July 29, 1997 through Suave House/Relativity Records. Composed of eleven songs, the album featured ten exclusive tracks performed by Suave House artists The Fedz, 8Ball & MJG, NOLA, Tela, Nina Creque, Thorough and Randy, with the exception of South Circle's "Geto Madness", which appeared on their 1995 album Anotha Day Anotha Balla. Production was handled by Smoke One Productions and DJ Slice T, with Tony Draper serving as executive producer. The album peaked at number 26 on the Billboard 200 and number 4 on the Top R&B Albums.

Track listing

Sample credits
Track 5 contains samples from "Candy" written by Larry Blackmon and Thomas Jenkins

Personnel
Roger Tausz – engineering, mixing
Tristan "T-Mix" Jones – mixing
John Moran – mastering
Tony Draper – executive producer, coordinator
Pen & Pixel – artwork, design, layout

Charts

References

External links

1997 compilation albums
Hip hop compilation albums
Gangsta rap compilation albums
Record label compilation albums
Relativity Records compilation albums